Yanna McIntosh (born 1970), sometimes credited as Yanna MacIntosh, is a Jamaican-born Canadian television, movie and theatrical actress.

Early life
McIntosh attended the University of Toronto and the Institute for Advanced Theater Training at Harvard University, in which she trained for acting in theatrical productions. She taught students of theatre at the National Theatre School of Canada and Humber College.

Career
Yanna McIntosh's theatre credits include Petruchio in The Taming of the Shrew, Hedda in Hedda Gabler, Mary in Friedrich Schiller's Mary Stuart, and Condoleezza Rice in David Hare's Stuff Happens.

McIntosh's most notable recurring roles in television series include Dr. Currie in the short-lived 90's medical drama Side Effects, Jenni Hernandez in Riverdale, Edna Myles in The Eleventh Hour, Dr. Rollins in Blue Murder, Zona Robinson in This is Wonderland, and Ms. Dymond in the Canadian teen drama The Best Years. She has starred in a number of made-for-television movies, such as Atomic Train (1999), in which she played Christina Roselli, Strange Justice (1999), in which she played Jeanette, Deliberate Intent (2000), in which she played Elaine, Crown Heights (2004), Chasing Freedom (2004), in which she played Ruth, Reversible Errors (2004), in which she played Genevieve Carriere, Doomstown (2006), in which she played Pat Barrows, Why I Wore Lipstick to My Mastectomy (2006), in which she played Dr. Crone, They Come Back (2007), in which she played Naketha, and Matters of Life and Dating (2007). She 
voices Jenny the giraffe in another Canadian animated TV show called Willa's Wild Life.

Some of her appearances in movies and direct-to-video films include Nicole in Spooky House (2000), Penny Mills in Full Disclosure (2001), Teddy Vargas in The Sentinel (2006), and Diana in Finn's Girl (2007). Other roles include Down in the Delta (1998), John Q (2002), and Heaven on Earth (2008).

In 2011 McIntosh played the starring role of Mama Nadi in Lynn Nottage's Pulitzer Prize-winning play Ruined, produced by Obsidian Theatre and Nightwood Theatre.

In 2014, she played Cleopatra in a Stratford Festival production of William Shakespeare's Antony and Cleopatra. The production was also filmed for the CBC Television series CBC Presents the Stratford Festival as Antony and Cleopatra; McIntosh garnered a Canadian Screen Award nomination as best actress in a television film or miniseries at the 4th Canadian Screen Awards for the role.

In 2019, McIntosh joined the San Francisco production of Harry Potter and the Cursed Child as Hermione Granger.

Reception
In his 2007 article on McIntosh's role as Mary Stuart in the Friedrich Schiller play of the same name, chief theatre critic Richard Ouzounian of the Toronto Star described McIntosh as capable of good performances on difficult stage roles, titling his article "No role too bold for Mary Stuart star". In his later review of the play, Ouzounian, who rated the play with two stars out of four, stated that McIntosh's role as Stuart and Nancy Palk's role as Elizabeth I of England were among the few highlights he saw in the play.

Her performance as Pat Barrows in the 2006 made-for-TV movie Doomstown won Yanna McIntosh the 2007 Gemini award for Best Performance by an Actress in a Featured Supporting Role in a Dramatic Program or Mini-Series. For her theatrical acting, she has received six Dora Mavor Moore Award nominations in the Best Actress category. She won the award twice; once for Florence Gibson's Belle and again for Athol Fugard's Valley Song.

In 2011, McIntosh became the first ever person to win the Toronto Theatre Critics' Award for Best Actress in a Play for her performance in Ruined. For this role, she also won the 2011 Dora Mavor Moore Award for Outstanding Performance by a Female in a Principal Role.

Filmography

Film

Television

References

Further reading
 Re: Producing Women's Dramatic History By D.A. Hadfield. Pages 105 - 113. Published by Talonbooks, in 2007. Original from the University of Michigan. /

External links
 
 Edinburgh Festival 2001: Theatre: Lambton Kent / Traverse Theatre

Black Canadian actresses
Canadian film actresses
Canadian stage actresses
Canadian television actresses
Best Supporting Actress in a Television Film or Miniseries Canadian Screen Award winners
Harvard University alumni
Jamaican emigrants to Canada
Place of birth missing (living people)
Jamaican film actresses
Jamaican television actresses
Living people
1970 births
Dora Mavor Moore Award winners
University of Toronto alumni
Academic staff of Humber College
Academic staff of the National Theatre School of Canada
20th-century Jamaican actresses
21st-century Jamaican actresses
Canadian Shakespearean actresses